Robin Muller van Moppes (born 10 May 1984 in Amsterdam) is a Dutch footballer who played in midfield for Cypriot second division side Onisilos Sotira, having previously played for Belgian side, KV Oostende. He also played in the youth of Ajax.

References

1984 births
Living people
Dutch footballers
Dutch expatriate footballers
Challenger Pro League players
K.V. Oostende players
Footballers from Amsterdam
Onisilos Sotira players
Cypriot Second Division players
Expatriate footballers in Belgium
Expatriate footballers in Cyprus
Association football midfielders
JOS Watergraafsmeer players
HVV Hollandia players